Manuel Velez Pangilinan,   (born July 14, 1946), also known by his initials MVP, is a Filipino businessman and sports patron. He is the managing director and CEO of First Pacific Company Limited, a Hong Kong-based investment management and holding company with operations in the Asia-Pacific region. Pangilinan is also First Pacific's chairman for the group's investments in the Philippines, such as Metro Pacific Investments Corporation, PLDT, and Philex Mining Corporation. He is chairman Emeritus of the Samahang Basketbol ng Pilipinas (SBP) and was its first president, having served two consecutive terms from 2007 to 2018.

Education

Pangilinan completed his primary and secondary education at San Beda College. He graduated cum laude from the Ateneo de Manila University with a Bachelor of Arts degree in Economics. Pangilinan won a competition sponsored by Procter & Gamble for a scholarship to the Wharton School of the University of Pennsylvania and graduated in 1968 with a Master of Business Administration degree.

Career
Pangilinan's first job was as the executive assistant to the president of the Philippine Investment Management Consultants, Inc. (PHINMA) where he served for six years.

In 1976, Pangilinan relocated to Hong Kong as executive director at Bancom International, an investment bank, where he gained experience in international finance. He then went on to the American Express in Hong Kong as an investment banker.

In Hong Kong, Pangilinan co-founded First Pacific in 1981 with Sudono Salim and Salim's son, Anthoni Salim. In 1987, Pangilinan established Metro Pacific as First Pacific's investment arm in the Philippines. As chairman of Metro Pacific, Pangilinan contributed to nation building through major investments in power distribution and energy innovations (Meralco), urban water concession (Maynilad Water Services), tollways (Metro Pacific Tollways Corporation), upgrading hospitals and health services (Metro Pacific Investments Corporation). He is also Chairman of TV5 and Philex Mining Corporation.

In 1998, First Pacific acquired PLDT, the largest telecommunications firm in the Philippines. The company, which had once been troubled by debt and technological issues, improved under First Pacific's management to become the nation's leading provider of digital communications.

Pangilinan is also a major patron of Philippine sports. He owns three PBA teams – TNT KaTropa, the Meralco Bolts and the NLEX Road Warriors. He founded the Samahang Basketbol ng Pilipinas (SBP), the national sport association for basketball in the Philippines. He served as the first president of SBP for two consecutive terms (2007 to 2016). He is currently the chairman emeritus of SBP. He was elected to the Central Board of FIBA in 2014. Moreover, his MVP Sports Foundation has supported other Philippine athletes, some of whom won gold medals in the 2018 Asian Games.

Involvement in sports
Pangilinan is a sports patron having been raised from a basketball loving family. His mother was a fan of the San Beda Red Lions basketball team and was best friends with Caloy Loyzaga. His father played the sport along with baseball and tennis. Pangilinan himself plays badminton. Through the MVP Foundation, Pangilinan funds initiatives on badminton, boxing, golf and taekwondo.

Honors
National Honors
: Order of Lakandula, Commander – (May 24, 2006)
: Order of Lakandula, Grand Cross – (June 5, 2010)

See also
Kapampangan Development Foundation
Smart Communications
PLDT
Sun Cellular
Meralco

References

External links

Biography at Asian Affairs
Biography at Metro Pacific
Manny Pangilinan Speech to 2006 Ateneo Graduates

1946 births
Living people
Ateneo de Manila University alumni
Basketball people in the Philippines
Businesspeople in telecommunications
21st-century Filipino businesspeople
Kapampangan people
People from Manila
PLDT people
Wharton School of the University of Pennsylvania alumni
Filipino sports executives and administrators
TV5 Network executives
Filipino company founders
Filipino chairpersons of corporations
Grand Crosses of the Order of Lakandula